Dešenice is a market town in Klatovy District in the Plzeň Region of the Czech Republic. It has about 700 inhabitants.

Administrative parts
Villages of Datelov, Děpoltice, Divišovice, Matějovice, Městiště, Milence, Oldřichovice and Žiznětice are administrative parts of Dešenice.

References

Populated places in Klatovy District
Market towns in the Czech Republic